Red Leaves / 紅葉 is an English-language and Japanese bilingual literary magazine.

Description
Based out of Melbourne, Australia and Tokyo, Japan, Red Leaves / 紅葉 is edited by writers Kirk Marshall and Yasuhiro Horiuchi, and designed by Liberty Browne. The inaugural issue was translated by Sunny Suh, Asami Nishimura and Joo Whan Suh. The journal is produced independently through the small press imprint, A Cowboy Named Molasses Publishing, and was first published and launched in May, 2010, during the 2010 Emerging Writers' Festival in Melbourne. It featured contributions from thirty writers, including Ivy Alvarez, Toby Litt, Nathaniel Rich, Nicholas Hogg, Travis Jeppesen, Eric Dando, Patrick Holland, Jeremy Balius, Mandy Ord, Hirofumi Sugimoto, Daisuke Suzuki, Kenji Siratori, Keiji Minato, Kuniharu Shimizu, Tokihiko Araki and Iris Yamashita. The magazine is released as an anthology annually and showcases short fiction, manga, creative non-fiction and poetry. It is concerned with exhibiting the work of emerging and established authors, with an aesthetic focus on experimental narrative, cultural transnationalism and cross-cultural poetics. The second issue, a spoken-word collection, would be released in 2013.

References

External links
 Kirk Marshall's online weblog
 Review by Ashley Capes
 Review by Michelle Cahill

Annual magazines
Literary magazines published in Australia
Literary magazines published in Japan
Magazines established in 2010
Magazines published in Melbourne
Magazines published in Tokyo